Calaphidinae is a subfamily of aphids in the family Aphididae. There are more than 60 genera and 360 described species in Calaphidinae.

Genera
These 63 genera belong to the subfamily Calaphidinae:

 Andorracallis Quednau, 1999
 Appendiseta Richards, 1965
 Apulicallis Barbagallo & Patti, 1991
 Betacallis Matsumura, 1919
 Betulaphis Glendenning, 1926
 Bicaudella Rusanova, 1943
 Boernerina Bramstedt, 1940
 Calaphis Walsh, 1863
 Callipterinella van der Goot, 1913
 Cepegillettea Granovsky, 1928
 Chromaphis Walker, 1870
 Chromocallis Takahashi, 1961
 Chuansicallis Tao, 1963
 Chucallis Tao, 1963
 Clethrobius Mordvilko, 1928
 Cranaphis Takahashi, 1939
 Crypturaphis Silvestri, 1935
 Ctenocallis Klodnitsky, 1924
 Dasyaphis Takahashi, 1938
 Eucallipterus Schouteden, 1906
 Euceraphis Walker, 1870
 Hannabura Matsumura, 1917
 Hoplocallis Pintera, 1952
 Hoplochaetaphis Aizenberg, 1959
 Hoplochaitophorus Granovsky, 1933
 Indiochaitophorus Verma, 1970
 Lachnochaitophorus Granovsky, 1933
 Latgerina Remaudière, 1981
 Melanocallis Oestlund, 1923
 Mesocallis Matsumura, 1919
 Mexicallis Remaudière, 1982
 Monaphis Walker, 1870
 Monellia Oestlund, 1887
 Monelliopsis Richards, 1965 (pecan aphids)
 Myzocallis Passerini, 1860
 Neobetulaphis Basu, 1964
 Neochromaphis Takahashi, 1921
 Neocranaphis
 Neosymydobius Baker, 1920
 Oestlundiella Granovsky, 1930
 Panaphis Kirkaldy, 1904
 Patchia Baker, 1920
 Phyllaphoides Takahashi, 1921
 Platyaphis Takahashi, 1957
 Protopterocallis Richards, 1965
 Pseudochromaphis Zhang, 1982
 Pterocallis Passerini, 1860
 Quednaucallis Chakrabarti, 1988
 Sarucallis Shinji, 1922
 Serratocallis Quednau & Chakrabarti, 1976
 Shivaphis Das, 1918
 Siculaphis Quednau & Barbagallo, 1991
 Sinochaitophorus Takahashi, 1936
 Symydobius Mordvilko, 1894
 Takecallis Matsumura, 1917 (bamboo aphids)
 Taoia Quednau, 1973
 Therioaphis Walker, 1870
 Tiliaphis Takahashi, 1961
 Tinocallis Matsumura, 1919
 Tuberculatus Mordvilko, 1894
 Wanyucallis Quednau, 1999
 † Subtakecallis Raychaudhuri & Pal, 1974
 † Tinocalloides Basu, 1970

References

 
Hemiptera subfamilies